Paulus is a Latin surname meaning "small" or "humble".

List of persons with the surname
Alvarus Paulus, 9th century Spanish scholar and poet
Anete Paulus (born 1991), Estonian footballer
Caroline von Paulus (born 1959), French actress, fashion model and singer, better known by her stage name - Bambou
Christoph Paulus (1852–1915), American politician
Friedrich Paulus (1890–1957), German field marshal of World War II (who commanded German Sixth Army at Stalingrad in 1942-43)
Greg Paulus (born 1986), basketball player at Duke University and football player at Syracuse University
Heinrich Paulus (1761–1851), German theologian
Jean-Georges Paulus (1816-1898), French musician
Jeff Paulus (born 1969), Canadian soccer coach
Julius Paulus, 2nd-3rd centuries AD
Lucius Aemilius Paulus (disambiguation), several ancient Romans
Norma Paulus (1933–2019), American politician and lawyer
Pieter Paulus, Dutch politician and leading ideologue of the Patriot movement
Sergius Paulus, Proconsul of Cyprus, first century AD
Stephen Paulus (1949–2014), American composer
Thomas Paulus (born 1982), German footballer

See also
Paulis (disambiguation), includes list of people with surname Paulis
Powlus, surname

References